In mathematics, the Golomb sequence, named after Solomon W. Golomb (but also called Silverman's sequence), is a monotonically increasing integer sequence where an is the number of times that n occurs in the sequence, starting with a1 = 1, and with the property that for n > 1 each an is the smallest unique integer which makes it possible to satisfy the condition. For example, a1 = 1 says that 1 only occurs once in the sequence, so a2 cannot be 1 too, but it can be, and therefore must be, 2. The first few values are
1, 2, 2, 3, 3, 4, 4, 4, 5, 5, 5, 6, 6, 6, 6, 7, 7, 7, 7, 8, 8, 8, 8, 9, 9, 9, 9, 9, 10, 10, 10, 10, 10, 11, 11, 11, 11, 11, 12, 12, 12, 12, 12, 12 .

Examples
a1 = 1  
Therefore, 1 occurs exactly one time in this sequence.

a2 > 1 
a2 = 2

2 occurs exactly 2 times in this sequence.   
a3 = 2

3 occurs exactly 2 times in this sequence. 

a4 = a5 = 3

4 occurs exactly 3 times in this sequence. 
5 occurs exactly 3 times in this sequence.

a6 = a7 = a8 = 4  
a9 = a10 = a11 = 5

etc.

Recurrence
Colin Mallows has given an explicit recurrence relation .  An asymptotic expression for an is

 

where  is the golden ratio (approximately equal to 1.618034).

References

External links
 Python code for Golomb Sequence

Integer sequences
Golden ratio